Portucale can mean:
Portus Cale, old Roman name of an ancient town and port in current day Portugal, in the area of today's Grande Porto (north of the country)
Portucale, the name by which, at the time of the Suebi and Visigoths, the area of today's Grande Porto was known
County of Portugal, the predecessor of the kingdom of Portugal
Portugal, the European country, whose name derives from Portucale
Porto (also Oporto), a city in northern Portugal and the second largest city in Portugal. The name Porto comes from the Portu root of Portucale
Vila Nova de Gaia, or simply Gaia, a city in Portugal, in the Porto district. The name Gaia comes from the Cale root of Portucale